Scartella caboverdiana is a species of combtooth blenny found in the eastern central Atlantic Ocean, around Cape Verde.  This species reaches a length of  TL.

References

caboverdiana
Taxa named by Hans Bath
Fish described in 1990